A north wind is a wind that originates in the north and blows in a southward direction. The north wind has had historical and literary significance, since it often signals cold weather and seasonal change in the Northern hemisphere. In the Southern Hemisphere, especially in southern Australia, the north wind is a hot wind which often leads to bushfires.

Mythology

In Greek mythology, Boreas was the god of the north wind and bringer of cold winter air.
 In Roman mythology the north wind was represented by Aquilo and Septentrio.
In Inuit mythology, Negafook represents "the North Wind" or, more eloquently, "the spirit that likes cold and stormy weather."
In Egyptian mythology, Qebui is the god of the north winds.

In literature
In the Bible, (Song of Solomon 4:16) the bride is calling for the North (and South) Wind to blow on her garden. 
One of Aesop's most famous fables is called The North Wind and the Sun.
The North wind plays a part in the Norwegian fable, "East of the sun and west of the moon", as the only wind capable of helping a woman fly to the titular location to find her husband.
The wind plays an important role in another Norwegian folktale, "The Lad who went to the North Wind", giving the lad a tablecloth that produces food, a donkey that produces gold, and a stick that beats a person on command.

Modern literature 
In George MacDonald's children's novel At the Back of the North Wind (serialized in the children's magazine Good Words for the Young beginning in 1868 and was published in book form in 1871), the title character, in the form of a beautiful woman, appears to a boy named Diamond and takes him on a series of nightly journeys.
Oscar Wilde's fairy tale The Selfish Giant (1888) personifies the North Wind as a man who "was wrapped in furs, and he roared all day about the garden, and blew the chimney-pots down".
In the second generation of the Pokémon games (first released in Japan in 1999 and to Australia and North America in 2000 and Europe in 2001), Suicune is said to be the incarnation of the north winds.
The wind is also a character in Bill Willingham's comic series, Fables (2002-2015). He is the father of Bigby Wolf and adept at shapeshifting.
Winter's Child (2009), Cameron Dokey's novel adaptation of the Hans Christian Andersen fairytale, "The Snow Queen", cites the North Wind as the main factor in the Snow Queen's transformation from a mortal to the titular Winter Child.
In the first issue of the Little Nightmares comic series (2017) created by Titan Comics, the North Wind is depicted as a humanoid antagonist. 
In "The Prophet", Lebanese poet Kahlil Gibran compares love to the north wind, saying it destroys our dreams as the wind destroys a garden: 

"When love beckons to you, follow him,
Though his ways are hard and steep.
And when his wings enfold you yield to him,
Though the sword hidden among his pinions may wound you.
And when he speaks to you believe in him,
Though his voice may shatter your dreams
as the north wind lays waste the garden." (1-7)

Music
Jim Croce's song, titled "I Got a Name" (1973), references the North Wind in the verse: "Like the North Wind whistling down the sky, I got a song."
Cher's song, titled "Thunderstorm" (1977), references the North Wind in the verse: "I swear I heard the North Wind call your name."
Gordon Lightfoot's ballad, "The Wreck of the Edmund Fitzgerald" (1976), references the North Wind in the verse: "Could it be the north wind they'd been feeling?"
Carol King's song "You've Got a Friend" (1971) references the North Wind in the verse: "And that old north wind should begin to blow."
Evan Rachel Wood's song, titled "All Is Found" (2019) which is from Frozen 2, references the North Wind in the verses: "Where the North Wind meets the sea, there's a river full of memory. " and " Where the North Wind meets the sea, there's a mother full of memory. "

Visual arts
The North Wind, an 1891 painting by Frederick McCubbin

Movies 
In Chocolat, Vianne Rocher (Juliette Binoche), an expert chocolatier and her six-year-old daughter Anouk (Victoire Thivisol), drift across Europe following the north wind.

See also
West wind
East wind
South wind
Dzungarian Gate

References

Greek mythology
Winds